Erling is a Scandinavian male name, meaning "Heir of clanchief", i.e. prince or similar. Notable people 
named Erling include:

Given name
Erling Aas-Eng (born 1965), Norwegian politician
Erling Aastad (1898–1963), Norwegian long jumper and sprinter
Erling Aksdal (born 1953), Norwegian jazz pianist and composer
Erling Andersen (1905–1993), American cross-country skier
Erling Andersen (born 1960), Norwegian race walker
Erling Anger (1909–1999), Norwegian civil servant
Erling Bauck (1924–2004), Norwegian World War II resistance member and writer
Erling Blöndal Bengtsson (1932–2013), Danish cellist
Erling Brøndum (1930–2017), Danish journalist and politician
Erling Christophersen (1898–1994), Norwegian botanist, geographer and diplomat
Erling Dorf (1905–1984), American geologist
Erling Drangsholt (1885–1950), Norwegian actor
Erling Eidem (1880–1972), Swedish theologian who served as archbishop of Uppsala 1931–1950
Erling Folkvord (born 1949), Norwegian politician
Erling Haaland (born 2000), Norwegian footballer
Erling Jevne (born 1966), Norwegian cross-country skier
Erling Amandus Johansen (1886–1961), Norwegian politician
Erling Kagge (born 1963), Norwegian explorer, lawyer, art collector, entrepreneur, politician, author and publisher
Erling Knudtzon (born 1988), Norwegian footballer
Erling Kongshaug (1915–1993), Norwegian rifle shooter 
Erling Krogh (1888–1968), Norwegian operatic tenor
Erling Lorentzen (1923–2021), Norwegian-Brazilian shipowner and industrialist
Erling Mandelmann (1935–2018), Danish photographer
Erling Dekke Næss (1901–1993), Norwegian shipowner and businessman 
Erling Persson (1917–2002), Swedish founder of H&M
Erling Skakke  (1115–1179), 12th century Norwegian earl
Erling Skjalgsson (975–1028), Norwegian political leader of the late 10th and early 11th century
Erling Steinvegg (died 1207), candidate of Bagler to the Norwegian throne from 1204 to 1207
Erling von Mende (born 1940), German professor of Sinology at FU Berlin
Erling Viksjø (1910–1971), Norwegian architect
Erling Wold (born 1958), American contemporary composer

Surname
Tapani Erling (born 1945), is a Finnish economist

See also
Erlang (programming language)
Earling, Iowa, United States
Earling, West Virginia, United States

Danish masculine given names
Norwegian masculine given names
Scandinavian masculine given names
Swedish masculine given names